The San Bruno Mountain Ecological Reserve is a nature reserve of  on the north slope of San Bruno Mountain,  south of San Francisco, California, adjacent to the San Bruno Mountain State Park. It is managed by the California Department of Fish and Game to protect and preserve habitat, wildlife and open space, including the pristine Buckeye Canyon and parts of Owl Canyon.

In  1989, the state Wildlife Conservation Board purchased the land as an ecological reserve with Proposition 70 funds.  Proposition 70, the California Wildlife, Coastal and Park Land Conservation Bond Act, was approved by California voters in 1988.

References

External links
 USFWS San Bruno Mountain Habitat Conservation Plan.
 California Department of Fish and Game San Bruno Mountain Ecological Reserve.

Protected areas of San Mateo County, California
Nature reserves in California
1989 establishments in California
Protected areas established in 1989